This article lists times that items were renamed due to political motivations. Such renamings have generally occurred during conflicts; for example, World War I gave rise to anti-German sentiment among Allied nations, leading to disassociation with German names.

Asia 
In response to United Nations General Assembly Resolution 3379, Israel renamed avenues called "UN Avenue" in Haifa, Jerusalem, and Tel Aviv to "Zionism Avenue".
Iran: During the Jyllands-Posten Muhammad cartoons controversy in 2006, several Iranian groups advocated changing the name of the Danish pastry to "Roses of the Prophet Muhammad".
Philippines: On September 12, 2012, the Philippine President Benigno Aquino III signed Administrative Order No. 29 renaming parts of the South China Sea, "West Philippine Sea". The renamed portions of the sea are within the exclusive economic zone of the Philippines and contains the islands of Spratlys and Scarborough Shoal which are disputed among five other countries.

Indian subcontinent

Oceania 
Australia: During World War I, jam-filled buns known as Berliners were renamed Kitchener buns, and a sausage product known as "Fritz" was renamed "Devon" (or "luncheon meat").
Managers at Sea World, a major Australian marine park, renamed their Fairy Penguins to "Little Penguin", saying "we just didn't want to upset the gay community. The new name is more politically correct" but also stated that "We didn't have any complaints about the name of the penguins." Spokespeople for several LGBT+ organisations expressed views that the change was unnecessary. 
However some organisations have also shifted to "Little Penguin" for apolitical reasons, a spokesman for Phillip Island Nature Park stated that their motivation to instead use "Little Penguin" was that it is closer to their scientific title. 
New Zealand: In 1998, while the French government was testing nuclear weapons in the Pacific, French loaves were renamed Kiwi loaves in a number of supermarkets and bakeries.

Europe 
Cyprus: Greek-Cypriots began to market Turkish delight as Cyprus delight after the Turkish invasion of Cyprus.
France:
French Revolution: The Committee of Public Safety went so far as to banish all words associated with royalty. A major example of their work was taking Kings and Queens out of playing cards and replacing them with Committee members. It lasted less than a year. It is commonly believed that this was also the time when Aces earned their status as being both the highest card and the lowest card.
World War I: Coffee with whipped cream, previously known as Café Viennois (Vienna coffee), was renamed Café Liégeois (Coffee from Liège) due to the state of war with Austria-Hungary. This appellation is still in use today, mainly for ice creams (chocolat liégeois and café liegeois).
Germany: In 1915, after Italy entered World War I, restaurants in Berlin stopped serving Italian salad.
Greece: Ellinikos kafes 'Greek coffee' replaced Turkikos kafes 'Turkish coffee' on Greek menus in the 1960s and especially after the 1974 Cyprus crisis.
Russia: 
During World War I, Saint Petersburg was renamed 'Petrograd', amounting effectively to a translation of the name from German to Russian.
At a meeting on November 16, 2016, with the prime ministers of Armenia, Belarus, Kazakhstan, and Kyrgyzstan, Russia's prime minister Dmitry Medvedev suggested that Americano coffee should be renamed "Rusiano coffee". Also, in 2014, following Moscow's annexation of Crimea, several cafes on the peninsula changed their menus to read "Russiano" and "Crimean", in place of Americano coffee.
Spain: After the triumph of Francisco Franco, filete imperial ("imperial beef") became a euphemism for filete ruso ("Russian beef"), "ensaladilla nacional" ("national salad") for "ensaladilla rusa" (Russian salad) and Caperucita Encarnada ("Little Red Riding Hood") for Caperucita Roja (which has the same meaning but loses its hypothetical connotations).
Ukraine: see Decommunization in Ukraine, Derussification in Ukraine, List of Ukrainian toponyms that were changed as part of decommunization in 2016 and List of streets renamed due to the 2022 Russian invasion of Ukraine
United Kingdom: 
World War I:
The German Shepherd was renamed the "Alsatian", and German biscuits were renamed Empire biscuits due to strong anti-German sentiment.
The members of the British royal house, a branch of the German House of Saxe-Coburg and Gotha, severed ties with their German cousins following several bombing raids on England by the first long-range bomber, the Gotha G.IV starting in March 1917.  On July 17, 1917, King George V changed the family's name to the House of Windsor.

North America 

Canada:
World War I: the Ontario city of Berlin was renamed Kitchener.
 United States:
American Civil War: Before 1863, Belleville, Illinois was known as Bellville and named in honor of Tennessee politician John Bell. After the outbreak of the Civil War, the name was officially changed to Belleville to distance the city from Bell, who had defected to the Confederacy.
World War I:  The German Spitz was renamed the American Eskimo Dog.
Great Depression:  In 1928, during the last months of the Calvin Coolidge administration, Congress approved the construction of a dam on the Colorado River southeast of Las Vegas, Nevada.  The press referred to it as "Boulder Dam" as a reference to the construction site, Boulder Canyon.  While in Nevada in 1930, Secretary of the Interior Ray Lyman Wilbur referred to the project as "Hoover Dam", a reference to Republican President Herbert Hoover.  Following Hoover's defeat by Democrat Franklin D. Roosevelt, Wilbur's successor, Harold L. Ickes, declared in 1933 that the dam should be called "Boulder Dam".  In 1947, the Republican-controlled Congress changed the name back to "Hoover Dam".
War on Terror:  During the 2003 invasion of Iraq, freedom fries was a short-lived political euphemism for French fries, used by some to express their disapproval of the French opposition to the invasion. In response to the French government's opposition to the prospective invasion of Iraq in 2003, Republican Chairman on the Committee of House Administration Bob Ney renamed French fries "Freedom Fries" in three Congressional cafeterias and the change was originally supported and followed by some restaurants. Usage has since reverted to the original term.
 List of name changes due to the George Floyd protests, mainly names considered to honor people with racist views, or which are offensive to certain ethnic or racial groups

See also
 Geographical renaming
 Inclusive language

Notes

Figures of speech
Censorship
Events relating to freedom of expression
Self-censorship
Political terminology
Linguistic controversies
Euphemisms